Pedda Gedda is a 1982 Indian Kannada-language film, directed by H. R. Bhargava and produced by Dwarakish. The film stars Aarathi, Dwarakish and Jayamala. The film has musical score by K. V. Mahadevan.

Cast

Aarathi
Dwarakish
Jayamala
Vishnuvardhan in Guest Appearance
Bharathi Vishnuvardhan in Guest Appearance
Madhu Malini
Sundar Krishna Urs
Kanchana
Sundar Raj
Rathnakar
Bangalore Nagesh
Rajanand
Lokanath
Thai Nagesh
Hanumanthachar
Chethan Ramarao

Soundtrack

The music was composed by K. V. Mahadevan.

References

External links
 
 

1982 films
1980s Kannada-language films
Films scored by K. V. Mahadevan
Films directed by H. R. Bhargava